Cuorgnè (or  ) is a comune (municipality) in the Metropolitan City of Turin in the Italian region Piedmont, located about  north of Turin.

Cuorgnè is located at the mouth of the Orco Valley, and borders the following municipalities: Castellamonte, Pont Canavese, Borgiallo, Chiesanuova, Alpette, San Colombano Belmonte, Canischio, Valperga, and Prascorsano.

Curgné originated in the Middle Ages after the ancient town of Canava was destroyed by a flood of the Orco River (1030). Later it was held by Arduin of Ivrea's descendants, and, later, by the House of Savoy. It received the status of city in 1932. Sights include the Archaeological Museum of Canavese (with findings from the nearby area, in particular from the Neolithic Age) and the Sacro Monte di Belmonte, located in Valperga, a few kilometers outside the town.

References

External links
 www.comune.cuorgne.to.it

Canavese